The 1984 Indiana Hoosiers football team represented Indiana University Bloomington during the 1984 Big Ten Conference football season. Led by first-year head coach Bill Mallory, the Hoosiers compiled an overall record of 0–11 with a mark of 0–9 in conference play, placing last out of ten teams in the Big Ten. The team played home games at Memorial Stadium in Bloomington, Indiana.

Schedule

1985 NFL draftees

References

Indiana
Indiana Hoosiers football seasons
College football winless seasons
Indiana Hoosiers football